Wisconsin Lutheran School is a Lutheran elementary school in Racine, Wisconsin. It is operated by First Evangelical Lutheran Church of Racine and Water of Life Lutheran Church. The school is a member of the Wisconsin Evangelical Lutheran Synod and is a federation school of Shoreland Lutheran High School.

WLS serves students in grades kindergarten through 8. It offers a five-day-per-week preschool, before and after school care, and busing to students who live away from the school.

WLS has three campuses: The Early Childhood Campus (ECC) offers preschool and grades K-2, and is located at 2920 Bate Street on the south side of Racine; the Elementary School offers grades 3-5 and is located in downtown Racine at 734 Villa Street; and the Middle School offers grades 6-8 and is located in downtown Racine at 718 Grand Avenue.

Athletics 

Wisconsin Lutheran School is a member of the Shoreland Lutheran High School federation, and offers the following sports:
 Boys' soccer, grades 5-8
 Basketball, grades 5-8
 Cross country, grades 4-8
 Girls' volleyball, grades 5-8
 Softball (girls' and boys'), grades 5-8
 Girls' cheerleading, grades 5-8
 Shoreland Junior Football  grade 8

External links
WLS Server Website (Wikis, Webmail, Directory) (Mac OS X Server)
WLS Website, (Home, Faculty and Staff, Special Programs, Calendar, Links, Tuition and Fees, Special Forms, etc)
First Evangelical Lutheran Church Website (FEC Website)
 (Water of Life Lutheran Church Website)
(Shoreland Lutheran High School Website)

Buildings and structures in Racine, Wisconsin
Educational institutions established in 1979
Schools in Racine County, Wisconsin
Private elementary schools in Wisconsin
Lutheran schools in Wisconsin
1979 establishments in Wisconsin